= Union Gateway Bridge =

Bridge in Denver, Colorado, U.S.

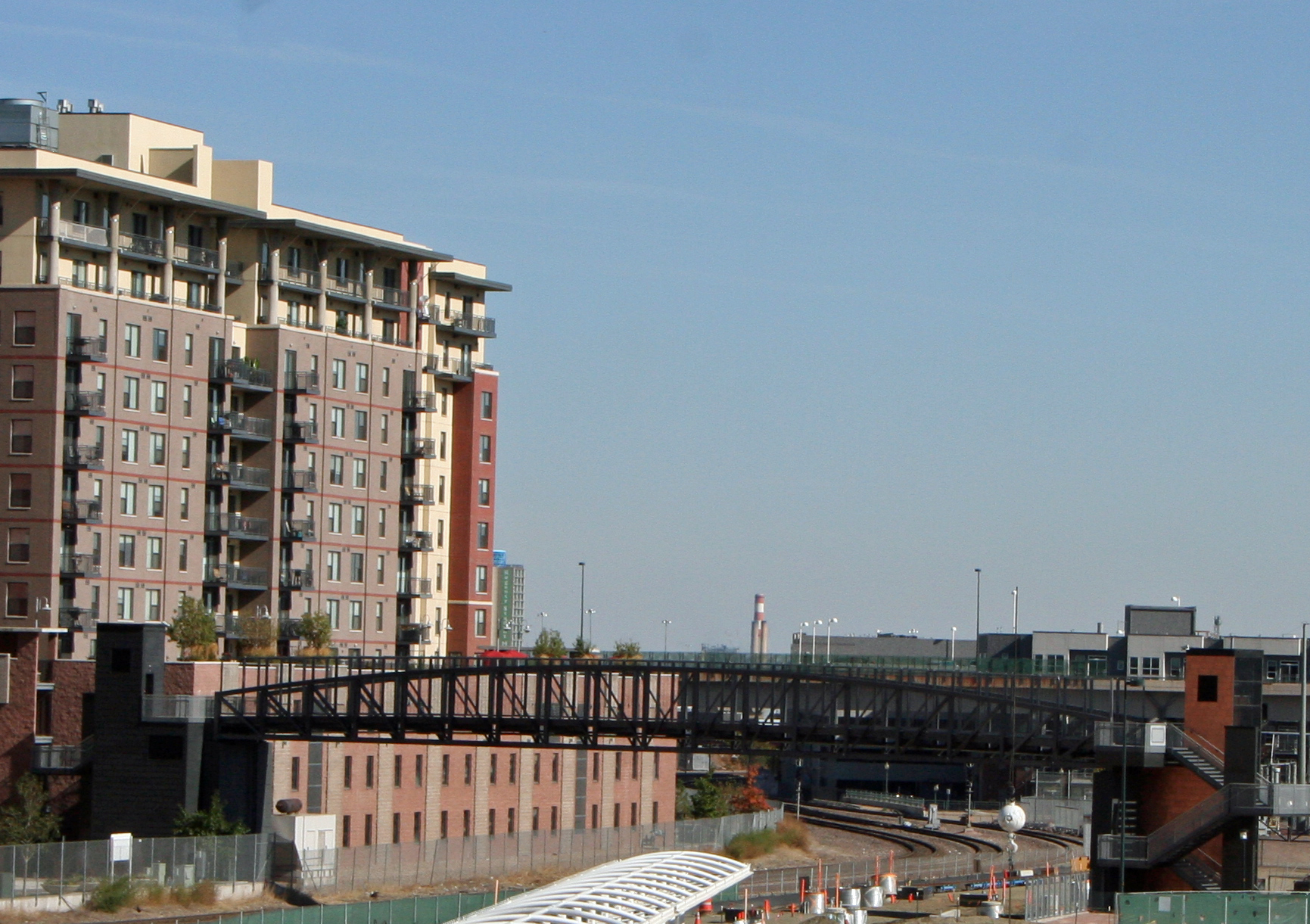
- The bridge in 2010
- Coordinates: 39°45′24″N 105°00′08″W
- Locale: Denver, Colorado, U.S.

Location
- Interactive map of Union Gateway Bridge

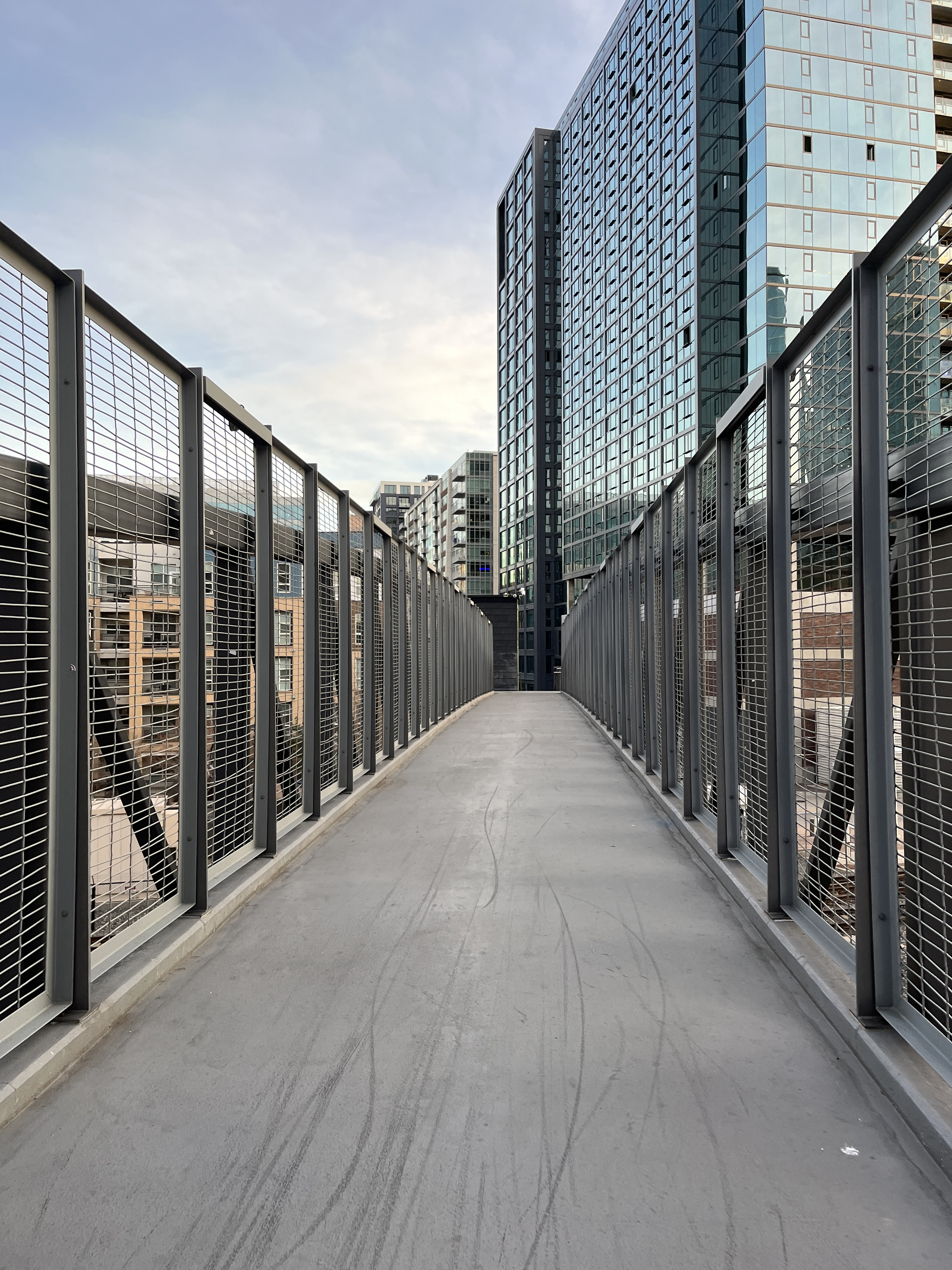
The bridge in 2025

The Union Gateway Bridge, also known as the 18th Street Pedestrian Bridge, is a bridge in Denver, Colorado, United States.
